The Highland Railway Loch class locomotives were large 4-4-0s normally used north of Inverness. They were introduced in 1896, to the design of David Jones. Fifteen were built by Dübs and Company in Glasgow, all going into traffic between July and September 1896. Three more were built in 1917 by Dübs' successor, the North British Locomotive Company (NBL).

Design
They had the typical Jones appearance with outside cylinders, domed cab roof, louvred chimney, but, as with the Jones Goods class 4-6-0, the Allan style front framing was dispensed with. Allan valve gear was still used.

Numbering

Built by Dübs in 1896

     
Built by NBL in 1917

These were needed primarily for the increased traffic on the Kyle line where they were the heaviest locomotives permitted. This period was when the initial traffic of the United States effort in World War I was flowing, and much was brought to the west coast of Scotland in an effort to reduce the effect of the U-boat menace. The trains ran from Kyle to Invergordon so it was a wholly HR traffic.

Transfer to LMS
They passed to the London, Midland and Scottish Railway (LMS) in 1923. The LMS classified them '2P'. Withdrawal occurred from 1930 onwards.

Transfer to BR
Only two survived into British Railways (BR) ownership in 1948. Neither received their allocated BR number before being withdrawn in 1948 ('Loch Insh') and 1950 ('Loch Tay').

References

Loch Class
4-4-0 locomotives
Dübs locomotives
NBL locomotives
Railway locomotives introduced in 1896
Standard gauge steam locomotives of Great Britain
Passenger locomotives